The Moncton Aigles Bleus and Moncton Aigles Bleues (French for: Moncton Blue Eagles) are the athletic teams that represent Université de Moncton in Moncton, New Brunswick, Canada. They play in U Sports, which encompasses university teams from across Canada, and play within the Atlantic University Sport conference. The name Moncton Aigles Bleus was formerly used for male teams only, with the female teams being called the Moncton Anges Bleus, but now the women's teams are called the Moncton Aigles Bleues.

Varsity Teams
Moncton currently has seven varsity programs competing in the following sports:
Cross-country, mixed 
Ice hockey, men and women
Soccer, men and women
Track and field, mixed 
Volleyball, women

The Aigles Bleus have a male and female hockey team, a male and female soccer team, a male and female athletics team, a male and female cross country running team and a female volleyball team.

Women's ice hockey

Championships
The men's hockey team has won 15 championships, 11 of those are at the Atlantic University Sport level, and 4 are at the national U Sports level. The women's hockey team has won one AUS trophy. The men's Athletics team has won 6 AUS. The women's Athletics team has won 2 AUS and women's volleyball has won 5 AUS titles.

See also
U Sports
Atlantic University Sport
Université de Moncton Aigles Bleus Hockey assault

References

External links
Université de Moncton Sports Schedule
Université de Moncton Sports Results
Université de Moncton Athletics

Université de Moncton
U Sports teams
Aigles Bleu
Sports teams in New Brunswick